Never Too Old is a 1914 American silent comedy film featuring Oliver Hardy.

Plot

Cast
 Marguerite Ne Moyer as Bella Donna
 Oliver Hardy as Phil (as Babe Hardy)
 James Levering as Bill Bowser
 John A. Murphy as Jim Levison

See also
 List of American films of 1914
 Oliver Hardy filmography

External links

1914 films
1914 short films
American silent short films
American black-and-white films
1914 comedy films
Silent American comedy films
American comedy short films
1910s American films